was a Japanese language input method that came standard with OS X and earlier versions of Classic Mac OS until OS X Yosemite. Kotoeri (written ことえり or 言選り) literally means "word selection".

To convert kana to kanji in macOS
Here is an example of using the Kotoeri input method to enter the kanji character for "crane" or "stork". From the International menu, a user would configure Kotoeri as one of the input methods to appear on the drop-down language selector.

The user must first select the "hiragana" syllabary in the international menu. Then type in the pronunciation of the word (in this case, "tsuru"), and the user will see "つる". Then, the user must press the spacebar and select the appropriate kanji for the word (鶴) on the menu that appears.

Converting kana to other non-kanji representations
With some katakana or hiragana text selected by highlighting it, the user may choose the "Convert to related character" option on the drop-down menu. The highlighted word is now shown underlined. Clicking on the underlined word presents a pop-up menu with four options. These are the hiragana, katakana, full-width rōmaji and half-width rōmaji equivalents of the selected word. Choosing the first option, for example, converts the selected word to the hiragana equivalent .

Converting kana to kanji
With some katakana or hiragana text selected by highlighting it, the user may choose the "Reverse conversion" option on the drop-down menu. A pop-up menu appears, which provides several possible kanji homophones:
At this point one chooses the kanji character or characters correctly representing the meaning of the desired word: 鶴.

See also
 Japanese input methods
 Cyrillization of Japanese

External links
http://docs.info.apple.com/article.html?artnum=24951

Apple Inc. software
Japanese writing system
Japanese-language computing